Mary Almy (1883–1967) was an American architect, and a partner at Howe, Manning & Almy, Inc., one of the first architecture firms founded by women in the United States and specializing in domestic architecture. She studied architecture at the Massachusetts Institute of Technology from 1917 to 1919.

Early life and education
Almy grew up in Cambridge, Massachusetts. She had polio as a child and walked with crutches throughout her life. In 1905 she graduated from Radcliffe College. She worked as a teacher before developing an interest in architecture. She earned a Bachelor of Science degree in architecture at the Massachusetts Institute of Technology in 1919 after three years of study. Due to academic policies in place at the time, female students were not accepted into the four-year program in Architecture, but limited to the two-year degree program in architectural drafting at MIT. Prior to her education at the Massachusetts Institute of Technology, Almy designed a summer home for her family on Cape Cod.

Career
Almy worked as a drafter at a London based architectural firm called Collcut and Hamp, for two years. In the 1920s she became a drafter for the Boston firm owned by Lois Lilley Howe and Eleanor Manning, who had also attended MIT. In 1926 she became a member of the American Institute of Architects and a partner at Howe, Manning & Almy, Inc. Upon becoming partner at the firm, she took over the position of chief draftsman. Despite surviving the Great Depression, the firm closed in 1937 after Howe retired. Manning and Almy continued in private practice. Almy also worked with landscape architect Henrietta Pope.

Works

Legacy
Mary Almy's papers reside in the collection for Howe, Manning and Almy at MIT. The Almy family papers are located at the Schlesinger Library at Radcliffe College. Howe, Manning, and Almy were the subject of a dissertation defended in 1976 at Boston University by Gail Morse.

References

1883 births
1967 deaths
MIT School of Architecture and Planning alumni
Architects from Cambridge, Massachusetts
Architects from Boston
People with polio
Radcliffe College alumni
American women architects
20th-century American architects
Museum designers
Quaker Philanthropy
Colonial Revival architecture